Victoria ("Vicky") Anne Lupton (born 17 April 1972 in Sheffield, West Riding of Yorkshire) is a retired female race walker from England.

Athletics career
Lupton twice competed for Great Britain at the Summer Olympics: 1992 and 1996. She set her personal best (45.19 minutes) in the 10 km race in 1995. She represented England in the 10 km walk event, at the 1994 Commonwealth Games in Victoria, British Columbia, Canada. Four years later she represented England, at the 1998 Commonwealth Games in Kuala Lumpur, Malaysia.

International competitions

References

 sports-reference

1972 births
Living people
Sportspeople from Sheffield
British female racewalkers
English female racewalkers
Olympic athletes of Great Britain
Athletes (track and field) at the 1992 Summer Olympics
Athletes (track and field) at the 1996 Summer Olympics
Commonwealth Games competitors for England
Athletes (track and field) at the 1994 Commonwealth Games
Athletes (track and field) at the 1998 Commonwealth Games
World Athletics Championships athletes for Great Britain